Parathelypteris is a genus of ferns in the family Thelypteridaceae, subfamily Thelypteridoideae, in the Pteridophyte Phylogeny Group classification of 2016 (PPG I). Other sources sink Parathelypteris into a very broadly defined genus Thelypteris.

Species
, the Checklist of Ferns and Lycophytes of the World accepted the following species:

Parathelypteris angustifrons (Miq.) Ching
Parathelypteris beddomei (Baker) Ching
Parathelypteris borealis (Hara) K.H.Shing
Parathelypteris caudata Ching ex K.H.Shing
Parathelypteris changbaishanensis Ching ex K.H.Shing
Parathelypteris chinensis (Ching) Ching
Parathelypteris chingii K.H.Shing & J.F.Cheng
Parathelypteris cystopteroides (D.C.Eaton) Ching
Parathelypteris glanduligera (Kunze) Ching
Parathelypteris grammitoides (Christ) Ching
Parathelypteris indochinensis (Ching) Ching
Parathelypteris miyagii (H.Itô) Nakaike
Parathelypteris nevadensis (Baker) Holttum
Parathelypteris nigrescens Ching ex K.H.Shing
Parathelypteris nipponica (Franch. & Sav.) Ching
Parathelypteris noveboracensis (L.) Ching
Parathelypteris pauciloba Ching ex K.H.Shing
Parathelypteris quinlingensis Ching ex K.H.Shing
Parathelypteris rechingeri Holttum
Parathelypteris serrulata (Ching) Ching
Parathelypteris trichochlamys Ching ex K.H.Shing

References

Thelypteridaceae
Fern genera